Capoeta fusca is a species of ray-finned fish endemic to Iran. It was first described by Alexander Nikolsky in 1897.

References 

Fusca
Fish described in 1897
Taxa named by Alexander Nikolsky